Leeroy Makovora (born 5 February 2002) is a Scottish professional footballer who plays as a striker for Penicuik Athletic.

Career
He made his senior debut for Heart of Midlothian on 13 May 2018, in a 1–0 league defeat away at Kilmarnock. He was one of four Hearts youth players to make their debuts in that match, alongside Chris Hamilton, Cammy Logan, and Connor Smith.

In August 2019 he moved on loan to Spartans. He was then loaned to Brechin City in September 2020. 

Makavora joined Gala Fairydean Rovers on loan on 2 December 2020.

He left Hearts on 31 May 2021, following the expiry of his contract.

Civil Service Strollers signed Makavora on 6 September 2021.

Makovora joined Penicuik Athletic for the 2022–23 season.

Career statistics

References

2002 births
Living people
Scottish footballers
People from Tranent
Heart of Midlothian F.C. players
Scottish Professional Football League players
Association football forwards
Spartans F.C. players
Brechin City F.C. players
Gala Fairydean Rovers F.C. players
Civil Service Strollers F.C players
Footballers from East Lothian
Penicuik Athletic F.C. players